Manada may refer to:

Manada Creek, a tributary of Swatara Creek in Dauphin County, Pennsylvania
Manada Gap, Pennsylvania, an unincorporated community in Dauphin County
Manada Hill, Pennsylvania, an unincorporated community in East Hanover Township, Dauphin County
USS Manada (YTB-224), a Cahto-class district harbor tug
La Manada rape case, Spain, 2016

See also
Manadas, a civil parish in the municipality of Velas in the Azores